Gabriele Ferzetti (born  Pasquale Ferzetti; 17 March 1925 – 2 December 2015) was an Italian actor with more than 160 credits across film, television, and stage. His career was at its peak in the 1950s and 1960s.

Ferzetti's first leading role was in the film Lo Zappatore (1950). He portrayed Puccini twice in the films Puccini (1953) and Casa Ricordi (1954). He made his international breakthrough in Michelangelo Antonioni's controversial L'Avventura (1960) as a restless playboy. After a series of romantic performances, he acquired a reputation in Italy as an elegant, debonair, and somewhat aristocratic looking leading man.

Ferzetti starred as Lot in John Huston's biblical epic, The Bible: In the Beginning... (1966), and played railroad baron Morton in Sergio Leone's Once Upon a Time in the West (1968). Perhaps his best known role, internationally, was in the James Bond movie On Her Majesty's Secret Service (1969) as Marc Ange Draco, although his voice was dubbed by British actor David de Keyser. He was perhaps best known to non-mainstream audiences for his role as the psychiatrist, Hans, in Liliana Cavani's The Night Porter (1974). In the 1970s, he appeared in a significant number of crime films, often as an inspector.

He appeared in Julia and Julia, opposite Laurence Olivier in Inchon (1982), and the cult film, First Action Hero. Later in his career, he played the role of Nono in the TV series Une famille formidable, while also appearing in Luca Guadagnino's 2009 film I Am Love.

Biography

Early life
Ferzetti was born as Pasquale Ferzetti in Rome, Italy on 17 March 1925. He studied at the Accademia d'Arte Drammatica in Rome, but was expelled.

Career

1940s
Ferzetti made his screen debut in Via delle Cinque Lune (1942) under the directorship of Luigi Chiarini, featuring actors such as Luisella Beghi, Olga Solbelli, Andrea Checchi, and Gildo Bocci. Uncredited for his next role in Bengasi, he was credited for Flavio Calzavara's La contessa Castiglione (also from 1942). He then took a break from film acting, instead making a succession of theatrical appearances until a small role in Lost Happiness (Felicità perduta, 1946) and Riccardo Freda's Les Misérables (uncredited, 1948). After a small role as a pilot in Flying Squadron (Rondini in volo, 1949) and a role in Sicilian Uprising (Vespro siciliano, also from 1949), a historic film set in 1282 during the War of the Sicilian Vespers, he appeared alongside Elli Parvo, Piero Lulli, Charles Vanel, and Marcello Mastroianni in Luigi Capuano's Vertigine d'amore and Fabiola (both from 1949) as Claudio. The antiquity drama, set in Rome, was warmly received.

1950s

Ferzetti had a supporting role in Flavio Calzavara's Sigillo rosso alongside Gino Cervi and Carla Del Poggio, but his first leading role came in Lo Zappatore (both from 1950), a film which focused on the life of peasants and farm workers during the interwar and great depression period. Roles now came in abundance for Ferzetti, from the crime comedy Welcome, Reverend! (Benvenuto, reverendo!, 1950) alongside Aldo Fabrizi, Massimo Girotti, and Lianella Carell, to Luis Trenker's film Barrier to the North (1950), to Guido Brignone's The Naked and the Wicked (1951) and Inganno (1952), to Curzio Malaparte's drama, The Forbidden Christ (Il Cristo proibito, 1951), to Antonio Pietrangeli's Empty Eyes (Il sole negli occhi, 1953). He starred in the successful biopic of composer Puccini under Carmine Gallone, Puccini (also 1953), and reprised the role in House of Ricordi (Casa Ricordi, 1954), also featuring Roland Alexandre as Gioacchino Rossini. Ferzetti starred in Mario Soldati's The Wayward Wife (La Provinciale, 1953), a Cannes Film Festival nominee for best film, which saw him play the role of a professor who falls in love with a glamorous star (Gina Lollobrigida). This comedy drama involves the tale of a Romanian countess who forces "Gemma" to become a prostitute. For his performance, Ferzetti received an award from the Italian National Syndicate of Film Journalists, and further cemented his status as a leading actor in Italy by appearing alongside Lollobrigida. Ferzetti appeared in Marcello Pagliero's comedy drama based on the play by Luigi Pirandello, Vestire gli ignudi (1954), playing the character of Ludovico Nota alongside Pierre Brasseur, Manlio Busoni, and Paolo Ferrara, and in Camilla (also 1954), under the directorship of Luciano Emmer.

Ferzetti starred in Michelangelo Antonioni's The Girlfriends (Le Amiche, 1955), as a downbeat, struggling artist named Lorenzo, with Eleonora Rossi Drago, Franco Fabrizi, and Valentina Cortese in the other leading roles. The film, shot on location in Turin, was adapted from Cesare Pavese's novella Tra donne sole (1949). Around the same time, he starred in Un po' di cielo (also from 1955), directed by Giorgio Moser, and Donatella (1956) opposite Elsa Martinelli, under director Mario Monicelli. The film was screened at the 6th Berlin International Film Festival. Ferzetti appeared in the crime film, Parola di ladro (1957), for directors Nanni Loy and Gianni Puccini, opposite Abbe Lane, Nadia Gray, and Andrea Checchi. He later appeared in Antonio Pietrangeli's Souvenir d'Italie, a romantic comedy which saw him feature alongside June Laverick, Isabelle Corey, and Ingeborg Schöner. Ferzetti appeared in Ballerina e Buon Dio (1958), directed by Antonio Leonviola, followed by Racconti d'estate, under the directorship of Gianni Franciolini, based on a story by Alberto Moravia. Ferzetti was cast in this romantic comedy, set in the Tigullio Gulf, alongside Alberto Sordi, Michèle Morgan, Marcello Mastroianni, Sylva Koscina, Dorian Gray, Franca Marzi, Franco Fabrizi, and Jorge Mistral. In 1959, Ferzetti starred alongside Andrée Debar and Isa Miranda as Bernard Turquet de Mayenne in the French historical comedy, Le secret du Chevalier d'Éon. Directed by Jacqueline Audry, the film is set in Burgundy in 1728. He later appeared in Carlo Ludovico Bragaglia's Hannibal, alongside Victor Mature, Rita Gam, Milly Vitale, and Rik Battaglia. The film is set during the Roman Republic; Ferzetti played Fabius Maximus.

1960s

Ferzetti starred in Gianni Puccini's Il carro armato dell'8 settembre (1960), followed by Florestano Vancini's La lunga notte del '43 (both 1960). The latter film was set during the Allied invasion of Italy in 1943 during the Second World War, and saw Ferzetti feature alongside Belinda Lee and Enrico Maria Salerno. It was a considerable success at the Venice Film Festival and was nominated for a Goldon Lion Award. He made his international breakthrough as an oversexed, restless playboy, Sandro, in Michelangelo Antonioni's L'Avventura (also 1960). Starring alongside Lea Massari and Monica Vitti romantically, his role was well received. Liz-Anne Bawden in The Oxford Companion to Film said, "The acting is excellent. Gabriele Ferzetti repeats and develops his role from Le Amiche of the inadequate male/artist".

Ferzetti entered one of the busiest periods of his career, featuring in seven films released during 1962. Among these were Il giorno più corto, directed by Sergio Corbucci, in Giuseppe Bennati's Congo vivo alongside Jean Seberg, in Jean Negulesco's American picture, Jessica, opposite Maurice Chevalier, Angie Dickinson, and Noël-Noël, and in Le Crime ne paie pas (US: Crime Does Not Pay) under director Gérard Oury. Among a large ensemble cast, Ferzetti had a role in Jean Delannoy's Imperial Venus (1963), and played the character of Leonardi in Charles Frend and Bruno Vailati's war drama, Torpedo Bay (also 1963), alongside Lilli Palmer, James Mason, and Alberto Lupo.

In Luis Lucia's musical comedy, Crucero de verano (1964), he appeared alongside Carmen Sevilla, Marisa Merlini, and José Alfayate and in Lo scippo (1965), alongside Paolo Ferrari, and played the role of Vic Dermatt in Jacques Deray's French crime drama, Par un beau matin d'été (Crime on a Summer Morning, also 1965), alongside Jean-Paul Belmondo, Sophie Daumier, and Geraldine Chaplin. He also had a role in Marcel Carné's Trois chambres à Manhattan (Three Rooms in Manhattan, 1965), a film which incidentally featured a young Robert De Niro in an uncredited role.

Ferzetti began to work on American projects. He starred as Lot in John Huston's biblical epic, The Bible: In the Beginning... (1966), based on the Book of Genesis. He also made his television debut with his appearance in two episodes of the American spy series, I Spy. Ferzetti starred in A ciascuno il suo (We Still Kill the Old Way, 1967) under director Elio Petri, and the TV series . Ferzetti featured in a total of eight films released in 1968, including Marcello Fondato's I protagonisti, Salvatore Samperi's Grazie zia, José María Forqué's Un diablo bajo la almohada, Roberto Faenza's Escalation, Alberto De Martino's Roma come Chicago, and Sergio Leone's western epic, Once Upon a Time in the West, in which he played Morton, the railroad baron, opposite acclaimed actors Henry Fonda and Charles Bronson.

In 1969, Ferzetti starred in Giuliano Montaldo's crime film, Gli intoccabili. The film was entered into the 1969 Cannes Film Festival.

He next starred in Un bellissimo novembre, directed by Mauro Bolognini. The film, based on a novel by Ercole Patti, united Ferzetti and Gina Lollobrigida once again in the leading roles. Ferzetti's most important performance in 1969, and arguably the role he is most associated with, internationally, was his role as distinguished organized crime boss Marc-Ange Draco in the 1969 James Bond feature On Her Majesty's Secret Service.

Directed by Peter Hunt, Ferzetti plays the father of Tracy di Vicenzo (Diana Rigg), who promises James Bond (George Lazenby) a handsome dowry for marrying her; they fall in love and marry anyway. Hunt had spotted Ferzetti in an Italian film, which he and Harry Saltzman were supposed to be reviewing another actor in, and both were immediately drawn to Ferzetti and persuaded the producers to test Ferzetti. However, despite speaking good English, his lines were dubbed by British actor David de Keyser, due to Ferzetti's strong Italian accent. In the end of the film, his character Draco's resources are vital in aiding Bond to destroy Ernst Stavro Blofeld's base at Piz Gloria. His final release of 1969 was L'amica, directed by Alberto Lattuada.

1970s
In 1970, Ferzetti starred in the political thriller, The Confession, opposite Yves Montand and Simone Signoret, under director Costa-Gavras. The film, based on the book by Lise London, explores the mental tortures facing the vice-minister of the Foreign Affairs of Czechoslovakia when he is imprisoned. The film was nominated for a Golden Globe Award. Ferzetti starred as an inspector in the crime picture, Cannabis, directed by Pierre Koralnik. The film involves the American mafia and a group of French drug lords. He also had an uncredited role in Terence Young's American picture, Cold Sweat. In 1971, Ferzetti featured in Salvatore Samperi's Million Dollar Eel, a comedy film about an heiress who fakes her own kidnapping and hides in the river Po's delta, in order to obtain money from her parents. In 1972, Ferzetti starred opposite Robert Blake, Catherine Spaak, and Ernest Borgnine in Franco Prosperi's boxing drama, Un uomo dalla pelle dura. A series of appearances in crime films followed, including Alta tension, Trois milliards sans ascenseur (1972), and Bisturi la mafia bianca (1973), directed by Luigi Zampa.

In 1973, Ferzetti appeared in the TV movie, Divorce His, Divorce Hers, under Waris Hussein, and Hitler: The Last Ten Days, a British-Italian produced picture directed by Ennio De Concini. Ferzetti played the role of Field Marshal Wilhelm Keitel opposite Alec Guinness (Adolf Hitler), Simon Ward, Adolfo Celi, and Diane Cilento. The following year of 1974, he again appeared in a World War II picture, this time the controversial arthouse classic about the Holocaust, The Night Porter, working under director Liliana Cavani. He starred alongside Dirk Bogarde and Charlotte Rampling and played Hans, a psychiatrist, one of his most notable roles. The film depicts the political continuity between wartime Nazism and post-war Europe, and the psychological continuity of characters locked into compulsive repetition of the past. Given the film's dark and disturbing themes, and a somewhat ambiguous moral clarification at the end, The Night Porter has tended to divide audiences and was accused of mere sensationalism. Film critic Roger Ebert said, "as nasty as it is lubricious, a despicable attempt to titillate us by exploiting memories of persecution and suffering."

Ferzetti continued to appear in crime films, including ...a tutte le auto della polizia (1975), directed by Mario Caiano, the German detective thriller Der Richter und sein Henker (1975), directed by Maximilian Schell, Eriprando Visconti's La Orca (1976), and Fernando Di Leo's Gli amici di Nick Hezard, a film about a Swiss heist. He also appeared in French director Roger Pigaut's picture, Le guêpier, opposite Claude Brasseur and Marthe Keller, and had a small role in Vincente Minnelli's fantasy, A Matter of Time in 1976, which featured a prominent cast, which included Ingrid Bergman and Liza Minnelli. In 1977, he starred in Eriprando Visconti's Oedipus Orca, and Lucio Fulci's The Psychic, about a clairvoyant woman (Jennifer O'Neill), who after having a vision, removes a section of the wall in the home of her husband (Ferzetti) and finds a skeleton behind it. In 1978, Ferzetti appeared in French director Claude d'Anna's picture, CIA contro KGB, alongside Bruno Cremer, Donald Pleasence, Hélène Lehman, Dennis Hopper, and Joseph Cotten. He also appeared in another French picture, the romantic drama Mon premier amour, directed by Elie Chouraqui.
In 1979, Ferzetti starred in Porci con la P 38, directed by Gianfranco Pagani, Gli anni struggenti, directed by Vittorio Sindoni, Incontro con gli umanoidi, directed by Anthony Richmond and Tonino Ricci, and also had an uncredited role in Terence Young's Bloodline. He also appeared in the TV series I vecchi e i giovani.

1980s–2015
Ferzetti played a Turkish brigadier in another of Young's pictures, the historical war film, Inchon (1981), with Laurence Olivier as General Douglas MacArthur. He appeared in Vatican Conspiracy (Morte in Vaticano, 1982) directed by Marcello Aliprandi, and starred alongside Franco Nero in the crime comedy, Grog (also 1982), directed by Francesco Laudadio, about two convicts who escape from prison and takes the family of a doctor as hostages.

In the mid-1980s, as he came closer to retirement age, Ferzetti's career in film began to decline, mainly appearing in low-budget TV movies and mini series, including an uncredited role in The Scarlet and the Black (1983) under Jerry London, and the mini-series Quo Vadis? (1985), La voglia di vincere (1987), and Around the World in 80 Days (1989). His only other films of the period were Julia and Julia (1987), directed by Peter Del Monte, in which he starred alongside Kathleen Turner, Gabriel Byrne, and Sting, and Computron 22, directed by Giuliano Carnimeo (1988).

In the 1990s, Ferzetti only appeared in minor or brief roles in TV movies, such as Voyage of Terror: The Achille Lauro Affair (1990), Black as the Heart (1991), Die Ringe des Saturn (1992), Natale con papà (1994) and mini-series such as Private Crimes (1995), in which he played Dr. Braschi. He did however appear in the film First Action Hero (1994), but his only major role of the 1990s was as the Duke of Venice in Othello (1995), directed by Oliver Parker. He also appeared in Renzo Martinelli's Porzûs and Alfredo Angeli's television series Con rabbia e con amore (both from 1997).

His best known role, after 1996, is as Nono in the French series Une famille formidable, in which he appeared in 11 episodes, between 1996 and 2007. He portrayed Enrico in Edoardo Leo's comedy picture, 18 Years Later (Diciotto anni dopo, 2010), which featured Marco Bonini in the lead role.

Death
Ferzetti died on 2 December 2015, aged 90.

Filmography

Cinema

 Street of the Five Moons (directed by Luigi Chiarini) (1942)
 Bengasi (directed by Augusto Genina) (1942) (uncredited)
 The Countess of Castiglione (directed by Flavio Calzavara) (1942)
 Felicità perduta (1946)
 Les Misérables (directed by Riccardo Freda) (1948) as Tholomyes, un cliente di Fantina (uncredited)
 Vertigine d'amore (directed by Luigi Capuano) (1949) 
 Fabiola (directed by Alessandro Blasetti) (1949) as Claudius
 William Tell (directed by Giorgio Pàstina) (1949) as Corrado Hant
 Sicilian Uprising (directed by Giorgio Pàstina) (1949) 
 Flying Squadron (directed by Luigi Capuano) (1949) as Ufficiale D'aviazione
 Benvenuto, reverendo! (directed by Aldo Fabrizi) (1950)
 Barrier to the North (directed by Luis Trenker) (1950) as Lieutenant Berti
 Red Seal (directed by Flavio Calzavara) (1950)
 Lo Zappatore (directed by Rate Furlan) (1950)
 The Forbidden Christ (also known as Strange Deception, directed by Curzio Malaparte) (Il Cristo proibito, 1951)
 The Ungrateful Heart (directed by Guido Brignone) (1951) as Giorgio Suprina
 The Lovers of Ravello (directed by Francesco De Robertis) (1951) as Sandro Deodata
 Deceit (directed by Guido Brignone) (1952) as Andrea Vannini
 Three Forbidden Stories (directed by Augusto Genina) (1952) as Comm. Borsani (First segment)
 The Wayward Wife (directed by Mario Soldati) (1953) as Il professore Franco Vagnuzzi
 Puccini (directed by Carmine Gallone) (1953) as Giacomo Puccini
 I falsari (directed by Franco Rossi) (1953) as Dario
 Empty Eyes (directed by Antonio Pietrangeli) (1953) as Fernando Maestrelli
 Vestire gli ignudi (directed by Marcello Pagliero) (1953) as Ludovico Nota
 Cento anni d'amore (directed by Lionello De Felice) (1954) as Carlo, the Political Prisoner (segment "Gli ultimi dieci Minuti")
 Modern Virgin (directed by Marcello Pagliero) (1954) as Gabriele Demico
 Camilla (directed by Luciano Emmer) (1954) as Dott. Mario Rossetti
 House of Ricordi (directed by Carmine Gallone) (1954) as Giacomo Puccini
 Le avventure di Giacomo Casanova (directed by Steno) (1955) as Giacomo Casanova
 Adriana Lecouvreur (directed by Guido Salvini) (1955) as Maurizio di Sassonia
 Le Amiche (directed by Michelangelo Antonioni) (1955) as Lorenzo
 Un po' di cielo (directed by Giorgio Moser) (1955)
 Il prezzo della gloria (directed by Antonio Musu) (1956)
 Difendo il mio amore (directed by Giulio Macchi) (1956) as Pietro Leonardi
 Donatella (directed by Mario Monicelli) (1956) as Maurizio
 Souvenir d'Italie (directed by Antonio Pietrangeli) (1957) as Lawyer Alberto Cortini
 Parola di ladro (directed by Nanni Loy and Gianni Puccini) (1957)
 March's Child (directed by Antonio Pietrangeli) (1958) as Sandro
 Angel in a Taxi (directed by Antonio Leonviola) (1958) as Andrea
 Le insaziabili (Tant d'amour perdu, directed by Léo Joannon) (1958) as Frédéric Solingen
 Girls for the Summer (directed by Gianni Franciolini) (1958) as Giulio Ferrari
 Everyone's in Love (directed by Giuseppe Orlandini) (1959) as Arturo
 Le secret du Chevalier d'Éon (Storie d'amore proibite, directed by Jacqueline Audry) (1959) as Bernard Turquet de Mayenne
 Hannibal (directed by Carlo Ludovico Bragaglia) (1959) as Fabius Maximus
 L'Avventura (directed by Michelangelo Antonioni) (1960) as Sandro
 La lunga notte del '43 (directed by Florestano Vancini) (1960) as Mario Villani
 Labbra rosse (directed by Giuseppe Bennati) (1960) as Avvocato Paolo Martini
 Il carro armato dell'8 settembre (directed by Gianni Puccini) (1960) as Tommaso
 Femmine di lusso (directed by Giorgio Bianchi) (1960) as Alberto Bressan
 Jessica (directed by Jean Negulesco) (1962) as Edmondo Raumo
 Rencontres (directed by Philippe Agostini) (1962) as Ralph Scaffari
 Congo vivo (directed by Giuseppe Bennati) (1962) as Roberto Santi
 La monaca di Monza (directed by Carmine Gallone) (1962) as Gian Paolo Osio
 Le Crime ne paie pas (directed by Gérard Oury) (1962) as Angelo Giraldi (segment "Le masque")
 Cross of the Living (La croix des vivants, directed by Ivan Govar) (1962) as L'abbé Delcourt / Abbe
 Imperial Venus (directed by Jean Delannoy) (1962) as Freron
 I Don Giovanni della Costa Azzurra (directed by Vittorio Sala) (1962) as Avvocato Leblanc
 The Shortest Day (directed by Sergio Corbucci) (1963) as Tenente in trincea
 Torpedo Bay (directed by Bruno Vailati and Charles Frend) (1963) as Leonardi
 A Sentimental Attempt (directed by Massimo Franciosa and Pasquale Festa Campanile) (1963) as Giulio
 Mort, où est ta victoire? (directed by Hervé Bromberger) (1964) as Max Gurgine
 The Warm Life (directed by Florestano Vancini) (1964) as Guido
 Desideri d'estate (directed by Silvio Amadio) (1964)
 Crucero de verano (directed by Luis Lucia) (1964) as Carlos Brul y Betancourt
 Crime on a Summer Morning (Par un beau matin d'été, directed by Jacques Deray) (1965) as Victor Dermott
 Three Rooms in Manhattan (Trois chambres à Manhattan, directed by Marcel Carné) (1965) as Comte Larsi
 Lo scippo (directed by Nando Cicero) (1965) as Gambetti
 The Bible: In the Beginning... (directed by John Huston) (1966) as Lot
 The Devil in Love (directed by Ettore Scola) (1966) as Lorenzo de' Medici
 We Still Kill the Old Way (A ciascuno il suo, directed by Elio Petri) (1967) as Avvocato Rosello
 Calda e... infedele (Un diablo bajo la almohada, directed by José María Forqué) (1968) as Anselmo
 Escalation (directed by Roberto Faenza) (1968) as Augusto Lambertinghi
 Come Play with Me (directed by Salvatore Samperi) (1968) as Stefano
 Better a Widow (directed by Duccio Tessari) (1968) as Don Calogero Minniti
 L'età del malessere (directed by Giuliano Biagetti) (1968) as Guido
 Roma come Chicago (directed by Alberto De Martino) (1968) as Commissioner
 Once Upon a Time in the West (directed by Sergio Leone) (1968) as Morton - Railroad Baron
 The Protagonists (directed by Marcello Fondato) (1968) as Il Commissario
 Machine Gun McCain (Gli intoccabili, directed by Giuliano Montaldo) (1969) as Don Francesco DeMarco
 That Splendid November (Un bellissimo novembre, directed by Mauro Bolognini) (1969) as Biagio
 On Her Majesty's Secret Service (directed by Peter Hunt) (1969) as Marc-Ange Draco
 L'amica (directed by Alberto Lattuada) (1969) as Paolo Marchesi
 The Confession (L'aveu, directed by Costa-Gavras) (1970) as Kohoutek
 Cannabis (directed by Pierre Koralnik) (1970) as Inspector Bardeche
 Cold Sweat (De la part des copains, directed by Terence Young) (1970) (uncredited)
 Un'anguilla da 300 milioni (directed by Salvatore Samperi) (1971) as Vasco
 Ripped Off (Un uomo dalla pelle dura, directed by Franco Prosperi) (1972) as Tony La Monica
 Doppia coppia con Regina (Alta tension, directed by Julio Buchs) (1972) as Pablo Moncada
 Mendiants et orgueilleux (directed by Jacques Poitrenaud) (1972)
 Trois milliards sans ascenseur (directed by Roger Pigaut) (1972) as M. Raphaël
 Divorce His, Divorce Hers (directed by Waris Hussein) (1973) as Turi Livicci
 Hitler: The Last Ten Days (Gli ultimi 10 giorni di Hitler, directed by Ennio De Concini) (1973) as Fieldmarshall Wilhelm Keitel
 Hospitals: The White Mafia (directed by Luigi Zampa) (1973) as Prof. Daniele Vallotti
 The Night Porter (Il portiere di notte, directed by Liliana Cavani) (1974) as Hans
 Appassionata (directed by Gianluigi Calderone) (1974) as Dr. Emilio Rutelli
 Kidnap (directed by Giovanni Fago) (1974) as Frank Salvatore
 Processo per direttissima (directed by Lucio De Caro) (1974) as L'avvocato Finaldi
 La prova d'amore (directed by Tiziano Longo) (1974)
 Corruzione al palazzo di giustizia (directed by Marcello Aliprandi) (1975) as Prandó
 ...a tutte le auto della polizia (directed by Mario Caiano) (1975) as Professore Andrea Icardi
 End of the Game (Der Richter und sein Henker, directed by Maximilian Schell) (1975) as Dr. Lutz
 Jackpot (directed by Terence Young) (1975)
 La Orca (directed by Eriprando Visconti) (1976) as Valerio
 Lezioni di violoncello con toccata e fuga (directed by Davide Montemurri) (1976) as Father of Stella
 Le guêpier (directed by Roger Pigaut) (1976) as Gaspard
 Nick the Sting (directed by Fernando Di Leo) (1976) as Maurice
 A Matter of Time (directed by Vincente Minnelli) (1976) as Antonio Vicari
 Oedipus Orca (directed by Eriprando Visconti) (1977) as Valerio
 Sette note in nero (directed by Lucio Fulci) (1977) as Emilio Rospini
 L'uomo di Corleone (directed by Duilio Coletti) (1977)
 Mon premier amour (directed by Elie Chouraqui) (1978) as Georges
 CIA contro KGB (L'ordre et la sécurité du monde, directed by Claude d'Anna) (1978) as Herzog
 Porci con la P 38 (directed by Gianfranco Pagani) (1978) as Max Astarita
 Suggestionata (directed by Alfredo Rizzo) (1978) as Gregorio
 Incontro con gli umanoidi (Encuentro en el abismo, directed by Anthony Richmond and Tonino Ricci) (1979) as Miles
 Bloodline (directed by Terence Young) (1979) as Maresciallo Campagna (uncredited)
 Gli anni struggenti (directed by Vittorio Sindoni) (1979) as Prof. Bivona
 Inchon (directed by Terence Young) (1981) as Turkish Brigadier
 Grog (directed by Francesco Laudadio) (1982) as Alberto
 Vatican Conspiracy (directed by Marcello Aliprandi) (1982) as Cardinale Ixaguirre
 Quartetto Basileus (directed by Fabio Carpi) (1983) as Mario Cantone
 Julia and Julia (Giulia e Giulia, directed by Peter Del Monte) (1987) as Paolo's Father
 Computron 22 (directed by Giuliano Carnimeo) (1988) as Il nonno
  (directed by Vittorio Sindoni) (1990) as Signor Mantoni
  (directed by Giovanna Gagliardo) (1991) as Gaetano Castelli
 First Action Hero (directed by Nini Grassia) (1994) as Ben Costa
 Othello (directed by Oliver Parker) (1995) as The Duke of Venice
 Con rabbia e con amore (directed by Alfredo Angeli) (1997) as Leone
 Porzûs (directed by Renzo Martinelli) (1997) as Storno vecchio
  (directed by Pasquale Squitieri) (2003) as Alfonso
 Lost Love (directed by Franco Battiato) (2003) as Tommaso Pasini
  (directed by Claudio Fragasso) (2004) as Vito Santamaria
 I Am Love (directed by Luca Guadagnino) (2009) as Edoardo Recchi Senior
 Diciotto anni dopo (directed by Edoardo Leo) (2010) as Enrico (final film role)

Television

 I Spy (2 episodes, 1966) as Aldo
  (directed by Mario Landi) (1967) as Bouchardon
 Divorce His, Divorce Hers (directed by Waris Hussein) (1973) as Turi Livicci
 A torto e a ragione (directed by Edmo Fenoglio) (1978) 
  (directed by Marco Leto) (1979) as Flaminio Salvo
 Quasi quasi mi sposo, directed by Vittorio Sindoni (1982) as The Engineer 
 The Scarlet and the Black, uncredited, directed by Jerry London (1983) as Prince Mataeo (uncredited)
 Delitto e castigo (directed by Mario Missiroli) (1983)
 Le ambizioni sbagliate (directed by Fabio Carpi) (1983) as Prof. Malacrida
 Die goldenen Schuhe (directed by Dietrich Haugk) (1983) as Marquesade Buenaventa
 Quo Vadis? (directed by Franco Rossi) (1985) as Piso
 Follia amore mio (directed by Gianni Bongioanni) (1986) 
 La voglia di vincere (directed by Vittorio Sindoni) (1987) as Professor Besson
  (directed by Giorgio Albertazzi) (1988) as Dr. Donhal
  (directed by Alberto Lattuada) (1988) as Procuratore
 Around the World in 80 Days (directed by Buzz Kulik) (1989) as Italian Chief of Police
 Pronto soccorso (directed by Francesco Massaro) (1990)
 Voyage of Terror: The Achille Lauro Affair (directed by Alberto Negrin) (1990)
 Nero come il cuore (directed by Maurizio Ponzi) (1991) as Signor Noé Alga Croce
 Die Ringe des Saturn (directed by Michael Kehlmann) (1992) 
 Private Crimes (directed by Sergio Martino) (1993) as Dottor Guido Braschi
 Natale con papà (directed by Giorgio Capitani) (1994)
  (directed by Giorgio Capitani) (1994) as Vittorio
 Alta società (directed by Giorgio Capitani) (1995)
 Un prete tra noi (directed by Giorgio Capitani and Lodovico Gasparini) (1997) as Ettore (1997)
 Il cielo sotto il deserto (directed by Alberto Negrin) (1998) as Father Jacob
  (directed by Dino Risi) (2002)
  (directed by Giorgio Capitani) (2005) as Livanos
  (directed by Giorgio Capitani) (2006) as Cardinal Siri
 Une famille formidable (11 episodes, 1992–2007) as Nono

References

External links

A 2009 photograph of Ferzetti

1925 births
2015 deaths
Male actors from Rome
Accademia Nazionale di Arte Drammatica Silvio D'Amico alumni
Nastro d'Argento winners
People of Lazian descent
Male Spaghetti Western actors